Hope Bourne (Hartland, Devon, 192022 August 2010) was a self-sufficient painter and writer who lived alone in primitive cottages and a caravan on Exmoor, surviving by growing her own vegetables, fishing, and hunting for rabbits.

Known as the Lady of Exmoor, she wrote five books on Exmoor and one novel set in North Devon, was the subject of three TV documentaries and contributed a weekly column to The West Somerset Free Press.

References 

1920 births
2010 deaths
20th-century English women writers
20th-century English women artists
British non-fiction writers
English women painters
People from North Devon (district)
Artists from Devon